Karen Elizabeth Landaverde Alfaro (born 16 December 1991) is a Salvadoran footballer who plays as a midfielder for Spanish club NSB Burgos CF and El Salvador women's national team.

International career
Landaverde has earned caps with the El Salvador under-17, under-20, under-21 and national women's teams.

International goals
Scores and results list El Salvador's goal tally first.

See also
List of El Salvador women's international footballers

External links
https://web.archive.org/web/20111004123552/http://www.elbaloncuscatleco.com/femenina-kl.html
Karen Landaverde's website

1991 births
Living people
Sportspeople from San Salvador
Salvadoran women's footballers
Women's association football midfielders
Club Atlético River Plate (women) players
Alianza F.C. footballers
El Salvador women's international footballers
Salvadoran expatriate footballers
Salvadoran expatriates in Argentina
Expatriate women's footballers in Argentina
Salvadoran expatriate sportspeople in Spain
Expatriate women's footballers in Spain